The 1997–98 Vancouver Canucks season was the team's 28th season in the National Hockey League (NHL). After missing the playoffs the season before, the team responded by signing Mark Messier to a three-year contract. The signing of Messier did little to improve the team, however, as they finished even worse than the year before, costing Head Coach Tom Renney and General Manager Pat Quinn their jobs. For the first time in NHL history, regular season games were played outside of North America, with the Canucks playing the Mighty Ducks of Anaheim in Tokyo, Japan, to open up the regular season. Pavel Bure became the last Canuck to score 50 or more goals in a season. On April 9, 1998, the Canucks scored three short-handed goals in a 6–3 road win over the Calgary Flames.

In addition, the team introduced a new logo that would stay in use since its debut, with minor colour alterations.

The team was the last in NHL history to record over 2,000 penalty minutes, with 2,148.

Off-season
Forward Trevor Linden resigned the team captaincy, in favour of new arrival Mark Messier.

Regular season
The Canucks finished the regular season with the most power-play opportunities against, with 432. Although the Canucks allowed the most goals in the League, with 273, they scored the most short-handed goals, with 19.

All-Star Game

The 48th National Hockey League All-Star Game took place at General Motors Place in Vancouver, British Columbia, home to the Vancouver Canucks, on January 18, 1998.

The International Showdown 
The 48th game was held in the very same year as the 1998 Winter Olympics in Nagano, providing the NHL to show its players from all over the world. To this extent, the NHL had the All-Star teams consist of a team of North Americans playing against a team of stars from the rest of the world. The format change also helped to intensify the game, as national pride would also become a factor. These provisions only applied to the players — coaches would still be selected based on which teams were the best from each conference at the time of the break.

Final standings

* At Yoyogi National Gymnasium in Tokyo, Japan

Player statistics

Forwards
Note: GP = Games played; G = Goals; A = Assists; Pts = Points; PIM = Penalty Minutes

Defencemen
Note: GP = Games played; G = Goals; A = Assists; Pts = Points; PIM = Penalty Minutes

Goaltending
Note: GP= Games played; W= Wins; L= Losses; T = Ties; SO = Shutouts; GAA = Goals Against

Transactions

Trades

Draft picks
Vancouver's picks at the 1997 NHL Entry Draft in Pittsburgh, Pennsylvania.

References
Canucks on Hockey Database

Vancouver Canucks seasons
Vancouver Canucks season, 1997-98
National Hockey League All-Star Game hosts
Vancouver C